Westfield Culver City (formerly known as the Fox Hills Mall), is a shopping mall in Culver City, California, owned by the Westfield Group.  Its anchor stores are JCPenney and  Macy's. Junior anchors are Best Buy, Nordstrom Rack, Target, Forever 21, H&M, and Trader Joe's.

History

Opened on October 6, 1975, the Fox Hills Mall was one of the first 3-level malls in California, owned and developed by Ernest W. Hahn, Inc. and Carter Hawley Hale Properties, Inc.  Gruen Associates were the project architects, but The Broadway was designed by William L. Pereira Associates.

Situated on a  site, the mall opened with:
The Broadway (became Macy's in 1996)
May Co. (became Robinsons-May in 1993)
JCPenney – opened later on January 14, 1976
80 of the eventual total of 131 ( of) mall shops – including Harris & Frank and Lerner's

There was parking for 4491 cars, including 2400 in a parking structure.

Notable elements of its original design were a glass-and-steel "theme" staircase in the center of the mall, as well as the angled bridges which connected the multiple levels.
Westfield America, Inc., a precursor to Westfield Group, acquired the shopping center in 1998 and renamed it "Westfield Shoppingtown Fox Hills", dropping the "Shoppingtown" name in June 2005. From 2005 to 2009, the mall was known as "Westfield Fox Hills". 

The theme staircase was removed during the 2009 renovation, but the bridges still remain as part of the center.

The former Robinsons-May department store closed in 2006 and was demolished in 2008 for a new wing including Target and a Best Buy store in 2009.

Dining Terrace
Los Angeles food critic Jonathan Gold gave the mall food court (officially called a "dining terrace") a complimentary review that highlighted the ethnic diversity of the food choices available: "After 60-odd years in Los Angeles, the city that practically invented the modern shopping center, a developer finally gets it...Fox Hills has always been among the most multiracial of Los Angeles malls, downhill from the posh African-American homes of Baldwin Hills and Ladera Heights, close to the Asian and Muslim enclaves of south Culver City, in proximity to Westchester and the Marina, Inglewood and Playa del Rey......Brilliant: not quite. But other mall operators would do well to pay attention."

Transit Access 
The mall has a transit center in the parking lot located between Sepulveda Blvd & Slauson Ave where transfers to many LACMTA & Culver CityBus lines can be made.

See also
Westfield Group

References

External links
official Westfield Culver City website
Kinney Shoe store commercial taped in Fox Hills Mall
Fox Hills Mall Opens in Culver City, Dick Turpin, Los Angeles Times, October 1975
Fox Hills Mall store list upon opening, 1975

Culver City
Shopping malls on the Westside, Los Angeles
Shopping malls established in 1975
Buildings and structures in Culver City, California
Victor Gruen buildings
1975 establishments in California